Ethan Waddleton (born 23 November 1996) is an English rugby union player. He has represented the England national rugby sevens team.

Waddleton attended St Joseph's College, Ipswich and trained as a youngster at Saracens Rugby as well as playing for Colchester RFC. He made his debut for the England national rugby sevens team in January 2017 and was part of the team that won bronze at the 2018 Commonwealth Games.

Waddleton competed for England at the 2022 Rugby World Cup Sevens in Cape Town.

References

1996 births
Living people
England international rugby sevens players
English rugby union players
Olympic rugby sevens players of Great Britain
Rugby sevens players at the 2020 Summer Olympics
Commonwealth Games medallists in rugby sevens
Commonwealth Games bronze medallists for England
Rugby sevens players at the 2018 Commonwealth Games
Rugby union players from Ipswich
Medallists at the 2018 Commonwealth Games